The following is a list of Michigan State Historic Sites in Macomb County, Michigan. Sites marked with a dagger (†) are also listed on the National Register of Historic Places in Macomb County, Michigan.


Current listings

See also
 National Register of Historic Places listings in Macomb County, Michigan
 List of Michigan State Historical Markers in Macomb County

Sources
 Historic Sites Online – Macomb County. Michigan State Housing Developmental Authority. Accessed May 17, 2011.

References

Macomb County
State Historic Sites
Tourist attractions in Macomb County, Michigan